Eknath Ramakrishna Ranade (19 November 1914 – 22 August 1982) was a social activist and leader that led the Rashtriya Swayamsevak Sangh.

Having joined the Rashtriya Swayamsevak Sangh (RSS) while still in school, he became an organiser and leader for the organisation, rising through its ranks to serve as its general secretary from 1956 to 1962. Ranade was greatly influenced by the teachings of Swami Vivekananda, and compiled a book of Vivekananda's writings. During the 1963–72 period, Ranade is considered to have played an instrumental role in the constructing of the Vivekananda Rock Memorial and the Vivekananda Kendra at Kanyakumari, Tamil Nadu.

Early life and education
Ranade was born on November 19, 1914, in Timtala, Amravati district, in the western Indian state of Maharashtra. In 1920 his family moved to Nagpur, and Ranade had his primary education in Pradanavispura School. In 1932 he passed his matriculation examination from the New English High School in Nagpur. After getting a Master of Arts degree in philosophy with honours, he went on to earn an L.L.B. from Sagar University in Jabalpur in 1945.

Rashtriya Swayamsevak Sangh
Ranade served as an important activist, ideologue, and leader for Rashtriya Swayamsevak Sangh, a volunteer organisation espousing a philosophy of Hindu Nationalism. He was influenced during his schooling years by K.B. Hedgewar, who founded the RSS in 1925, which Ranade joined as a Swayamsevak (volunteer) in 1926. After working for the RSS in Nagpur, in 1938, Ranade moved to Mahakoshal, Madhya Pradesh, as a Pranth Pracharak (Provincial organiser).

Following the assassination of Mahatma Gandhi in 1948, the RSS was banned, and many of its senior functionaries faced arrest. Ranade went underground during this time to lead organizational efforts, earning the moniker of the Underground Sarsanghchalak. At the same time the RSS launched a Satyagraha under the direction of its leader M. S. Golwalkar to lift the ban. With Golwalkar arrested on 15 November, Ranade led the satyagraha and participated in secret negotiations with Home Minister Sardar Patel. As a condition for rescinding the RSS ban, Patel insisted that the RSS should be organised with a written constitution. Ranade formed a constitution in association with P. B. Dani and Balasaeb Deoras, however, it fell short of expectations of the Government and as a result it was redrafted to include clauses such as allegiance to the Indian Constitution and National Flag, shunning violence, enrolling under aged to the movement only with the permission of their parents, setting procedures for election of sarsanghchalak  and so forth. The government accepted the re-drafted constitution, with modifications, in June 1949. The ban imposed on RSS was revoked on 11 July 1949.

In 1950 he worked as a Kshetra Pracharak for Poorvanchal Kshetra, comprising Bengal, Orissa, and Assam. In Calcutta, he established a Vastuhara Sahayata Samiti (lit. Committee to help the dispossessed) to aid refugees from Pakistan following the Partition of India. In 1953 Ranade became the Akhil Bharatiya Prachar Pramukh (lit. All-India Propagation Chief). From 1956 to 1962, Ranade served as RSS's general secretary. During this period, he tried to refocus RSS towards the task of character-building, instead of pursuing a more activist stance in coordination with affiliated organisations; these efforts met resistance from other senior leaders in RSS. In 1962, he was selected as All India Baudhik Pramukh of Rashtriya Swayamsevak Sangh.

On his death, Ranade was honoured as a Karmayogi by RSS publication, Organiser.

Vivekananda Memorial and Kendra

The teachings of Swami Vivekananda deeply influenced Ranade. In 1963, during the centenary year of Swami Vivekananda's birth, he published a selection of Vivekananda's writing under the title Rousing Call to Hindu Nation, as a personal tribute.

The same year, Ranade conceived the idea of building a monument in honor of Vivekananda at the mid-sea rock location near Kanyakumari, where Vivekananda had meditated for three days in December 1892. After receiving enthusiastic responses to the scheme from RSS chief M. S. Golwalkar and others, Ranade established the Vivekananda Rock Memorial Organising Committee and became its Organizing Secretary. Various committee branches were established across the country (with future BJP leader L. K. Advani serving as the organising secretary of the Delhi branch) to build support and later raise funds, for the memorial. When the idea was initially rejected by the Minister of Education and Culture Humayun Kabir, Ranade drummed up support from over 300 members of the Indian Parliament, which led to the project receiving approval from Prime Minister Indira Gandhi. Ranade also managed to win endorsement for the project from a diverse section of the political and spiritual community, including sections traditionally in opposition to RSS.

After the project was approved, Ranade led a cadre of volunteers to raise funds for construction from donors across the country; state governments and the central Government of India also contributed towards the Rs.12.5 million fund total. The Rock Memorial was completed in 1970 and inaugurated by President of India V. V. Giri on 2 September. During the birth centenary celebrations in 2014, Prime Minister Narendra Modi recalled the effectiveness of the Jan-Bhagidaari (Participation of people) scheme that was used by Eknath ji. This scheme encouraged every citizen of the country to pay 1 rupee as a donation so that everyone would be a part of this mission.

Two years later, Ranade founded the Vivekananda Kendra, centered at Kanyakumari with branches elsewhere, as a Hindu spiritual organisation based on the principles of "Renunciation and Service" preached by Vivekananda. The Kendra is a "lay service organization" without a guru or propagation of a "guru culture," though it was influenced by the teachings of Vivekananda. It has 206 branches in various parts of the country. He did not endorse the status of an "avatar-hood" (god incarnate) to the Kendra. He neither promoted himself or Vivekananda to the status of worship at the center but promoted the use of Omkara as its guiding principle. It was his view that by adopting Omkara as guru, the entire class of gurus of the country would be honored. Ranade became the President of the Vivekananda Kendra in 1978 after serving as its general secretary. A documentary titled "Eknath ji: One Life - One Mission" has been made by Vivekananda Kendra on his life.

Death and legacy
Ranade died in Madras from a fatal heart attack (now Chennai) on 22 August 1982. On 23 August 1982, he was cremated at Vivekanandapuram, Kanyakumari.

Publications
Ranade's publications are the "Swami Vivekananda's Rousing Call to Hindu Nation, the "Sadhana of Service" (1985), the "Story of Vivekananda Rock Memorial" and the "Kendra Unfolds".

See also
 Alasinga Perumal

Citations

References

Further reading

1982 deaths
1914 births
Activists from Maharashtra
People from Amravati district
Rashtrasant Tukadoji Maharaj Nagpur University alumni
Rashtriya Swayamsevak Sangh pracharaks